In the English speaking professional wrestling culture, a "dirt sheet" is a wrestling magazine, wrestling newsletter or website that covers professional wrestling from a real-life perspective as opposed to treating the storylines as real. Another term sometimes used for these publications is "rag sheet."

Reputation
Many wrestlers in the past resented so-called "dirt sheets" since they felt that they ruined the business by breaking kayfabe,  i.e. exposing professional wrestling as staged. However, second-generation wrestler Bret Hart recalls that many wrestlers themselves were avid readers of the magazines in his youth because they too wanted to keep up with the backstage news; other people such as wrestling journalists have backed up that this was the case in the past. Wrestler Steve Austin often saw wrestling newsletters passed around the locker rooms when he started out in the industry. In the 21st century some people in the industry, such as Vince Russo, Bruce Prichard and Eric Bischoff, still think that such publications hurt the wrestling business and also ruin the fans' immersion and enjoyment. Some wrestlers have themselves written for news websites, e.g. Matt Hardy for 411Mania. Chris Jericho created his own called Web Is Jericho.

List of publications or websites often considered dirt sheets
 Wrestling Observer Newsletter (WON), often considered the first "dirt sheet", created and run by Dave Meltzer
 Pro Wrestling Torch (PWTorch), created and run by Wade Keller
 Pro Wrestling Insider (PWInsider), created and run by Dave Scherer
 Pro Wrestling Sheet, created and run by Ryan Satin.
 Wrestling News World (WNW)

See also
 Glossary of professional wrestling terms
 The Dirt Sheet, a wrestling web series

References

External links
 The Wrestling Directory

Professional wrestling slang

Journalism